William Teall ( – 2001) was an English professional rugby league footballer who played in the 1930s and 1940s.

Background
Billy Teall's birth was  registered in Sculcoates, Hull, East Riding of Yorkshire, England.

Playing career

County honours
Billy Teall played for Yorkshire in 1937.

Challenge Cup Final appearances
Billy Teall played  in Wakefield Trinity's 13-12 victory over Wigan in the 1945–46 Challenge Cup Final during the 1945–46 season at Wembley Stadium, London on Saturday 4 May 1946, in front of a crowd of 54,730.

County Cup Final appearances
Bill Teall played , and scored 3-goals in Wakefield Trinity's 9-12 defeat by the Featherstone Rovers in the 1940–41 Yorkshire County Cup Final during the 1939–40 season at Odsal Stadium, Bradford on Saturday 22 June 1940, played  in the 2-5 defeat by Bradford Northern in the 1945–46 Yorkshire County Cup Final during the 1945–46 season at Thrum Hall, Halifax on Saturday 3 November 1945, played  in the 10-0 victory over Hull F.C. in the 1946–47 Yorkshire County Cup Final during the 1946–47 season at Headingley Rugby Stadium, Leeds on Saturday 31 November 1946, played  in the 7-7 draw with  Leeds in the 1947–48 Yorkshire County Cup Final during the 1947–48 Northern season at Fartown Ground, Huddersfield on Saturday 1 November 1947, and played , and scored a try in the 8-7 victory over Leeds in the 1947–48 Yorkshire County Cup Final replay during the 1947–48 Northern season at Odsal Stadium, Bradford on Wednesday 5 November 1947.

Testimonial match
A benefit season/testimonial match for Len Bratley and Billy Teall took place at Wakefield Trinity including the 29–0 victory over Hull F.C. at Belle Vue, Wakefield on Saturday 3 April 1948 during the 1947–48 season.

Club career
Billy Teall made his début for Wakefield Trinity in the 14-9 victory over York at Belle Vue, Wakefield on 3 October 1936, with 115 conversions he is 24th on Wakefield Trinity's all-time conversions list, he appears to have scored no drop-goals (or field-goals as they are currently known in Australasia), but prior to the 1974–75 season all goals, whether; conversions, penalties, or drop-goals, scored 2-points, consequently prior to this date drop-goals were often not explicitly documented, therefore '0' drop-goals may indicate drop-goals not recorded, rather than no drop-goals scored. In addition, prior to the 1949–50 season, the archaic field-goal was also still a valid means of scoring points.

References

External links

Search for "Teall" at rugbyleagueproject.org
 (archived by web.archive.org) Past-Players → T at hullfc.com
 (archived by web.archive.org) Statistics at hullfc.com
Saturday 3 April 1948 Official Programme

1910s births
2001 deaths
Broughton Rangers players
English rugby league players
Hull F.C. players
People from Sculcoates
Place of death missing
Rugby league fullbacks
Rugby league players from Kingston upon Hull
Wakefield Trinity players
Yorkshire rugby league team players